John Ward, 2nd Viscount Dudley and Ward (22 February 1725 – 10 October 1788) was a British peer and politician.

He was the son of John Ward, 1st Viscount Dudley and Ward, and his first wife Anna Maria (née Bourchier) and educated at Oriel College, Oxford.

He was returned to Parliament as one of two representatives for Marlborough in 1754, a seat he held until 1761, and then represented Worcestershire until 1774. The latter year he succeeded his father in the viscountcy and entered the House of Lords. Ward married Mary, daughter of Gamaliel Fair, gardener and seeds-man, who died on 17 December 1758, aged 69.

Ward died in October 1788, aged 63. As he had no sons he was succeeded in the viscountcy by his half-brother William.

A daughter
He had a natural daughter Anna Maria Ward (1778–1837), by his Viscountess (when she was still Mrs. Mary Baker, whom he later married). Lord Dudley in his will made an ample provision for the girl and appointed his widow, who died in 1810, and Henry Jerome de Salis as her guardians.
Anna Maria married Sir Horace St Paul, 1st Baronet, MP, on 14 May 1803.

Notes

References
Kidd, Charles, Williamson, David (editors). Debrett's Peerage and Baronetage (1990 edition). New York: St Martin's Press, 1990, 

1725 births
1788 deaths
Alumni of Oriel College, Oxford
Members of the Parliament of Great Britain for Worcestershire
British MPs 1754–1761
British MPs 1761–1768
British MPs 1768–1774
John
Viscounts in the Peerage of Great Britain